Galaxis is a 1995 science fiction action film directed by William Mesa and written by Nick Davis. It stars Brigitte Nielsen, Richard Moll and Craig Fairbrass. It was also released under the name Terminal Force.

The film received a negative review from the Houston Chronicle, which wrote it may actually be worse than direct-to-video productions.

Plot summary
A mythical gem, created at the birth of the universe, generates energy for sustaining vitality. Kyla (Richard Moll) tries to find the object and use its inherent energy to increase his villainous sphere of influence. He successfully obtains the device after defeating its protectors on Sintaria. Meanwhile, Ladera (Brigitte Nielsen), a freedom fighter with the ability of invisibility, makes her way to Earth to seek out a sister gem to stalemate Kyla and prevent him from obtaining the object. Once there, she discovers Jed (John H. Brennan) has already retrieved the object from its secure location. However, Victor Menendez (Fred Asparagus) and his mercenaries also wish to own the device as recompense for monies Jed owes them. After dispatching Victor and his minions, Ladera bands together with Jed to seek out the first gem and thwart Kyla's plans.

Cast
 Brigitte Nielsen as Ladera
 Richard Moll as Kyla
 John H. Brennan as Jed Sanders
 Roger Aaron Brown as Detective Carter
 Cindy Morgan as Detective Kelly
 Alan Fudge as Chief of Police
 Kristin Bauer van Straten as Commander
 Craig Fairbrass as Lord Tarkin
 Fred Asparagus as Victor Menendez
 Joey Gaynor as Stravos, Victor's Lieutenant
 Jeff Rector as Tray, Victor's Henchman
 Christopher Doyle as Seth, Victor's Henchman
 Michael Paul Chan as Manny Hopkins
 Richard Narita as Raymond, Manny's Nephew
 George Cheung as Eddie, Manny's Henchman
 Woon Young Park as Asian Henchman (uncredited)
 Jane Clark as Rape Victim
 Louise Moritz as Bar Lady At Sharkey's
 Sam Raimi as Nervous Official
 Arthur Mesa as Robot Child

Production

Filming
Galaxis was the feature film directorial debut for William Mesa. His prior credits included serving as visual effects supervisor for Under Siege and The Fugitive. The film is 91 minutes in duration. Filmmaker Sam Raimi made a cameo appearance in the movie.

Release
The film was released to VHS format for purchase in June 1995.

Reception
The Houston Chronicle wrote a negative review, commenting: "Movies like this could give 'direct to video' a bad name." The review wrote that the action sequences were alright, and that the film probably suffered from its low budget and poor script. In The Sci-Fi Movie Guide, Chris Barasanti called it "derivative and joyless".

Prequel
A prequel to the film was released as "The Survivor" in 1998, directed by Nick Davis, the screenwriter of the original. Richard Moll reprised his role as Kyla and Xavier Declie took over the role of Tarkin.

See also

 Flash Film Works
 List of science fiction films of the 1990s
 Roman and Williams

References

External links
 
 
 

1995 films
1995 independent films
1990s science fiction action films
American independent films
American science fiction action films
American space adventure films
1990s English-language films
Films about time travel
1990s American films